The Odd Man is a fictional comic book hero created by Steve Ditko. The character was intended to first appear in Shade, the Changing Man #9 but instead first appeared in Detective Comics #487 in December 1979.

Fictional character biography
Clay Stoner is a private detective living in River City. He has blue eyes and blond hair which changes to black hair when he acts as a vigilante wearing mismatched clothing under the name the Odd Man. He uses his wits and an elaborate series of gadgets to disorient and confuse his opponents. These include a weighted extended tie, a spray he developed which melts certain plastics, gloves that emit powder or smoke when he claps his hands together, and a slippery oil spray. He also has the ability to make his enemies black out, presumably through the use of one of his sprays or concoctions.

Origin
His weapons were absurd -- impossible! But somehow he became the terror of criminals, and everyone began to wonder ... who is the Odd Man?" (from "The Odd Man" by Steve Ditko, published in Detective Comics #487).

Publication history
The Odd Man was introduced in an eponymous story that had him pitted against the supposed reincarnation of the first Nile Queen and her Pharaoh consort:
 Detective Comics #487 (the Odd Man—debut, originally intended for Shade, the Changing Man #9) (December 1979 – January 1980)
 Superboy (vol. 4) #65 (August 1999)
 Mother Panic #3 – 6 (2016–2017)

References

External links
Clay Stoner (New Earth) at the DC Comics Database

Characters created by Steve Ditko
Comics by Steve Ditko
Comics characters introduced in 1979
Fictional private investigators
Superheroes